was a Japanese diplomat.

Biography
Watanabe was born in Tokyo, as a son of Akira Watanabe. He attended Hibiya High School and graduated from the University of Tokyo. He joined the Ministry of Foreign Affairs in 1959. He was Ambassador of Japan to Jordan from 1988 to 1990. He was Grand Chamberlain of Japan from 1996 to 2007 and director-general of the Ministry of Foreign Affairs of Japan from 1993 to 1995. He was an adviser to the Imperial Household Agency from 2012 on.

He was strongly opposed to the publication of the book Princess Masako: Prisoner of the Chrysanthemum Throne in 2007 and said the Imperial Household Agency could not accept it.

Watanabe died on 8 February 2022, at the age of 85.

References

1936 births
2022 deaths
Ambassadors of Japan to Jordan
People from Tokyo
University of Tokyo alumni